Kuno II of Falkenstein (actually Konrad von Falkenstein, born in 1320 at Burg Falkenstein in Donnersberg, died on 21 May 1388 at Burg Maus) was a German theologian and from 1362 to 1388 the Roman Catholic Archbishop Elector of Trier.

His mother, Johanna von Saarwerden, daughter of Johann I. von Saarwerden (son of Heinrich II. von Saarwerden, son of Ludwig III. von Saarwerden, son of Ludwig I. von Saarwerden, son of Folmar I. Graf von Saarwerden), was born ca. 1298, and died ca. 1347. About 1313, she married Philipp IV. von Falkenstein, son of Philipp II. von Falkenstein and Gisela von Kyrburg. He was born ca. 1269, and died ca. 1328.

References

External links
:de:s:ADB:Konrad II. von Falkenstein

Archbishop-Electors of Trier
1320 births
1388 deaths